Tsubasa is a unisex Japanese given name.

Tsubasa may also refer to:

Tsubasa (train), a train service in Japan
"Tsubasa" (Candies song)
"Tsubasa" (Alice Nine song)
"Tsubasa" (Eir Aoi song)
Tsubasa: Very Best of Mikuni Shimokawa, a 2009 compilation album by Mikuni Shimokawa
Tsubasa: Reservoir Chronicle and its sequel Tsubasa World Chronicle: Nirai Kanai-hen, Japanese manga and anime series by Clamp
Tsubasa: Those with Wings, a Japanese manga series by Natsuki Takaya
Tsubasa Bridge, official name of the Neak Loeung Bridge in Cambodia

See also
 Tackey & Tsubasa, a Japanese musical duo
Captain Tsubasa, a Japanese manga and anime series by Yoichi Takahashi
"Tsubasa o Kudasai", a Japanese folk song
Tsubasacon, an annual autumn anime convention in Huntington, West Virginia